North Fremantle is a suburb of Perth, Western Australia, located within the City of Fremantle, a local government area of the state. Its postcode is 6159.

North Fremantle is situated on a peninsula, with the Indian Ocean bounding the west side and the Swan River the east side. On the north side it is separated from the suburb of Mosman Park by McCabe Street. North Fremantle has one train station, located on Stirling Highway, which provides train services into Fremantle and Perth city. There are various bus stations in North Fremantle, providing access to outer Perth suburbs.

History

North Fremantle became an independent municipality in 1895. The municipality reunited with the City of Fremantle by an order of the Governor in Executive Council as from 1 November 1961.

Marshalling yards 
The suburb was once the site of Western Australian Government Railways Leighton Marshalling Yards, which linked the North Fremantle industrial area and North Quay.  They were developed in the 1950s.

The area has undergone significant redevelopment by the state government.

Businesses 
North Fremantle is home to Mojos bar; the Railway Hotel; the North Fremantle Bowling Club, a local community run club that supports local live music, and holds private functions and community events; and River Beach, Leighton Beach and Port Beach. North Fremantle has seen an increase of locally owned business along Stirling Highway including various cafes, restaurants and bars. The area's strong afternoon sea breeze (known as the "Fremantle Doctor") makes its ocean beaches a prime location for wind and kite surfing. The Fremantle Surf Life Saving Club has been active since the 1930s.

References

External links

 
Suburbs of Perth, Western Australia
Suburbs in the City of Fremantle